The women's 200 metres event  at the 1987 European Athletics Indoor Championships was held on 22 February.

Medalists

Results

Heats
First 2 from each heat (Q) and the next 2 fastest (q) qualified for the final.

Final

References

200 metres at the European Athletics Indoor Championships
200
Euro